The Steelers–Titans rivalry is a National Football League rivalry between the Pittsburgh Steelers and the Tennessee Titans that dates back to the 1970s when the Steelers and then-Houston Oilers played in the AFC Central. The two teams were realigned into separate divisions for the 2002 NFL season, however matchups are still considered heated between the two teams.

History

Origins
When the American Football League completed its merger with the NFL in 1970, three NFL teams were given a $3 million payment to join the former AFL teams to form the American Football Conference. While the Baltimore Colts and the Cleveland Browns readily joined the new conference (the Colts due to the money, the Browns due to owner Art Modell eyeing a potential intrastate rivalry with the Cincinnati Bengals), the Steelers were hesitant to join until Steelers owner Art Rooney told his son Dan Rooney that the payment plus keeping the rivalry with the Browns was important, although it was losing its longstanding rivalry with the Philadelphia Eagles. Additionally, a rivalry with the Bengals also made geographic sense for the team.

While the teams that would form the National Football Conference struggled to agree on a realignment proposal, the AFC teams quickly found an alignment. The Oilers, who were part of the AFL East before the merger simply because it was further east than the Kansas City Chiefs, were placed in the AFC Central with the Bengals, Browns, and Steelers, being the only team in the division that wasn't in or near Ohio. The Oilers were placed in the division at the insistence of Dan Rooney, much to the chagrin of Al Davis. The Oilers and Steelers became acquainted with each other right away, when the two teams met in the season opener of the 1970 NFL season in Pittsburgh, a 19–7 Oilers victory in the first-ever NFL game at Three Rivers Stadium. The two teams met again four weeks later at the Astrodome in Houston, a 7–3 Steelers victory. The opening season win would be the only time the Oilers would be ahead in the overall series; the series would be tied again in 1971, but since then the Steelers have had the overall series lead, currently at 43–31 in the regular season. At 78 meetings overall, the Oilers/Titans franchise has played the Steelers more than any other team in its history.

1970s
The rivalry didn't initially pick up steam, as the Steelers were starting to become a powerhouse in the NFL during the 1970s while the Oilers collapsed completely. However, the Oilers became a contender in the latter part of the decade and challenged the Steelers to division and conference supremacy. Unlike other rivalries such as the one between the Steelers and Browns that was based on the close proximity between the two teams and was more fan-driven, the rivalry between the Steelers and the Oilers/Titans franchise was driven on personal hatred between the two teams, much like the concurrent rivalry the Steelers had with the Oakland Raiders or the rivalry with the Baltimore Ravens decades later.

The two teams met in the AFC Championship Game two years in a row at Three Rivers Stadium, with the Steelers dominating the "Luv Ya Blue" Oilers 34–5. The Steelers were expecting a closer encounter in the 1979 AFC Championship Game, which was marred by a controversial call in the third quarter when quarterback Dan Pastorini threw a pass to wide receiver Mike Renfro in the end zone. It was ruled incomplete, despite television replays clearly showing Renfro having possession of the ball with both feet in the end zone; even Steelers radio commentator Myron Cope thought it was a touchdown. The Oilers had to settle for a field goal, and the Steelers would go on to win 27–13; the game itself would spark the debate on whether or not the NFL should have instant replay, which would go into effect for the 1986 NFL season.

1980s
Both teams hit hard times once the 1980s hit, with the Oilers quickly sinking to the bottom of the division and the Steelers hit with the retirement of several key players from the dynasty years, only remaining competitive due to the AFC Central as a whole being weak during this time. By 1987, the Oilers began to have sustained playoff appearances again under quarterback Warren Moon and controversial coach Jerry Glanville while the Steelers were still rebuilding from their mid-1980s dropoff.

However, the two teams would clinch a wild card spot in the playoffs in 1989, the only year Chuck Noll would win NFL Coach of the Year. During a regular season matchup in Pittsburgh earlier in the year, following the game the usually stoic Noll in post game handshake grabbed Glanville and told him he'd better watch out or he'd get jumped on. This was in reaction to Glanville's earlier comments on how the Oilers field was the 'house of pain' and his prediction that his players would intentionally hurt the Steelers; bounties are now outlawed in the NFL. In the Wild Card round, the Steelers, despite having been swept by the Oilers in the regular season, defeated the Oilers in overtime 26–23. Glanville would be fired from the Oilers after the game.

1990s
The Oilers were the class of the division for the early 1990s, winning two division championships, while the Steelers were slowly becoming a threat again under head coach Bill Cowher. The two would exchange division titles in 1992 and 1993 before the Steelers became the dominant team in the AFC Central due to Oilers owner Bud Adams going through with his threats to blow up the team and rebuild if it didn't go to the Super Bowl.

During this time, both teams were fighting for new stadiums in order to remain competitive. While the Steelers would eventually get one in Heinz Field (although they would've stayed in a refurbished Three Rivers Stadium if the financing plan for Heinz Field fell through), the Oilers couldn't get a new stadium built in Houston and announced they were moving to Nashville for the 1998 NFL season. The Steelers (along with the Bengals) were one of six teams to vote against the proposal out of respect to Houston fans due to the rivalry as well as having recently encountered similar issues with the Browns. The Oilers ended up moving to Tennessee for the 1997 season instead due to lame duck status in Houston; Houston would receive a new NFL team in 2002 when the Houston Texans started play.

Due to the size of Vanderbilt Stadium in Nashville (only 41,000 seats), the now-Tennessee Oilers decided to play at the Liberty Bowl Memorial Stadium in Memphis as an interim home until what would become LP Field was ready to open in 1999. Ironically, most of the crowds in Memphis were more than small enough that Vanderbilt Stadium would've been able to accommodate them. Despite that, the Oilers were planning on playing there again for 1998. That changed after the final game of the season, when the Oilers faced the Steelers in front of 50,677 fans—the only crowd that could not have been reasonably accommodated at Vanderbilt. However, Steeler fans made up the great majority of the crowd (at least three-fourths, by one estimate ), despite the fact that it was a meaningless game for both teams (the Steelers already clinched the AFC Central and a first-round bye in the playoffs, Oilers were already eliminated from the playoffs) and the Steelers were resting several starters. The Oilers won 16–6 against mostly Steelers backup players. Adams was so embarrassed that he abandoned plans to play the 1998 season in Memphis and ended up moving to Vanderbilt after all. Adams would rename the team the Titans in 1999 when Adelphia Coliseum (now LP Field) opened.

Since realignment
The NFL realigned its teams for the 2002 season, placing the Titans in the new AFC South while the Steelers remained in the now-renamed AFC North. Although the two teams wanted to remain together in the same division, they were not able to because the Titans' vote was controlled by the NFL since it recently relocated while the Steelers (along with the Bengals) were required to remain in the same division with the Browns as a result of the NFL's settlement with the city of Cleveland in 1996. Additionally, there was some sentiment to keep the Ravens in the same division as the Steelers, although at least one realignment proposal did have the Titans in the AFC North. Despite that, the Steelers and Titans have still played each other rather frequently, having only not played each other four times.

Perhaps the most notable matchup since realignment came in 2008, when the two met in Nashville in a game that determined home-field advantage in the AFC playoffs and a possible preview of the AFC Championship Game. LenDale White and Keith Bulluck stepped on a Terrible Towel after the Titans' 31–14 victory. Pittsburgh's Larry Foote responded, "They deserved to do that, they whooped us, they deserve to celebrate and, hopefully, we'll see them again," while Hines Ward said, "T. J. Houshmandzadeh did kind of the same thing and you see where they went." Former Steelers head coach Bill Cowher, by this point working for CBS as an analyst on The NFL Today, mentioned on The NFL Today (while clearly showing bias in favor of his former team) that such antics can come back to haunt teams. Tennessee proceeded to lose eight consecutive games, including their playoff game against the Ravens and their '09 Week 1 game against the Steelers, capped off by a 59–0 blowout to the New England Patriots, the Titans' worst loss ever.

The Steelers edged the Titans 13–10 to open the 2009 season and won again 38–17 in 2010.  In 2012, Matt Hasselbeck led the Titans to a close 26–23 win, and in 2013, Jake Locker led a 16–9 win over the Steelers.  In 2014, the Steelers rallied from down 24–13 to win 27–24.

The two teams met on November 16, 2017 at Heinz Field, in primetime on NBC and NFL Network. The game, part of the NFL Color Rush and the Steelers first color-on-color game since World War II, was won by Pittsburgh, 40–17.

The two teams met on October 25, 2020 in Nashville, with both clubs entering with identical 5–0 records. During a game rescheduled from its previous start date due to a COVID-19 outbreak within the Titans organization, Pittsburgh jumped to a 24–7 halftime lead before Tennessee rallied in the second half. The game was decided when Titans kicker Stephen Gostkowski missed a potential game-tying field goal at the end of regulation, allowing the Steelers to win 27–24 and attain its first 6–0 start since 1978.

Game Results

|-
| 
| Tie 1–1
| style="| Oilers  19–7
| style="| Steelers  7–3
| Tie  1–1
| Game in Pittsburgh was the first meeting between the two, and the first regular-season game at Three Rivers Stadium. This marks the only time the Oilers/Titans franchise has held the overall series lead in the history of the rivalry.
|-
| 
| Tie 1–1
| style="| Steelers  23–16
| style="| Oilers  29–3
| Tie  2–2
| 
|-
| 
| style="| 
| style="| Steelers  24–7
| style="| Steelers  9–3
| Steelers  4–2
| 
|-
| 
| style="| 
| style="| Steelers  33–7
| style="| Steelers  36–7
| Steelers  6–2
| 
|-
| 
| Tie 1–1
| style="| Oilers  13–10
| style="| Steelers  13–7
| Steelers  7–3
| Steelers win Super Bowl IX. The Oilers win was the Steelers last loss of the season.
|-
| 
| style="| 
| style="| Steelers  24–17
| style="| Steelers  32–9
| Steelers  9–3
| Steelers win Super Bowl X.
|-
| 
| style="| 
| style="| Steelers  32–16
| style="| Steelers  21–0
| Steelers  11–3
| 
|-
| 
| Tie 1–1
| style="| Steelers  27–10
| style="| Oilers  27–10
| Steelers  12–4
| 
|-
| 
| Tie 1–1
| style="| Oilers  24–17
| style="| Steelers  13–3
| Steelers  13–5
| Steelers win Super Bowl IX. The Oilers win was the Steelers last loss of the season.
|- style="font-weight:bold; background:#f2f2f2;"
| 1978 playoffs
| style="| 
| style="| Steelers  34–5
| 
| Steelers  14–5
| AFC Championship Game. First postseason meeting in the series. Steelers win Super Bowl XIII.
|-
| 
| Tie 1–1
| style="| Steelers  38–7
| style="| Oilers  20–17
| Steelers  15–6
| Monday night game.
|- style="font-weight:bold; background:#f2f2f2;"
| 1979 playoffs
| style="| 
| style="| Steelers  27–13
| 
| Steelers  16–6
| AFC Championship Game. Game was marked by controversy over the Mike Renfro no-touchdown call. Steelers win Super Bowl XIV.
|- valign="top"

|-
| 
| Tie 1–1
| style="| Steelers  31–17
| style="| Oilers  6–0
| Steelers  17–7
| Game in Houston was a Thursday night game. Oilers' first shutout win in the series.
|-
| 
| Tie 1–1
| style="| Steelers  26–13
| style="| Oilers  21–20
| Steelers  18–8
| Game in Pittsburgh was a Monday night game.
|-
| 
| style="| 
| no game
| style="| Steelers  24–10
| Steelers  19–8
| Game in Pittsburgh canceled due to 1982 strike. Game in Houston was the first game following the 1982 strike.
|-
| 
| style="| 
| style="| Steelers  17–10
| style="| Steelers  40–28
| Steelers  21–8
| 
|-
| 
| Tie 1–1
| style="| Steelers  35–7
| style="| Oilers  23–20(OT)
| Steelers  22–9
| First overtime game in the rivalry in the game in Houston.
|-
| 
| style="| 
| style="| Steelers  20–0
| style="| Steelers  30–7
| Steelers  24–9
| 
|-
| 
| style="| 
| style="| Steelers  21–10
| style="| Steelers  22–16(OT)
| Steelers  26–9
| 
|-
| 
| style="| 
| style="| Oilers  23–3
| style="| Oilers  24–16
| Steelers  26–11
| Game in Pittsburgh was the first win for Warren Moon in the series. First season sweep by the Oilers in the series.
|-
| 
| Tie 1–1
| style="| Oilers  34–14
| style="| Steelers  37–34
| Steelers  27–12
| First Sunday night game between the two. Steelers' lone road victory in 1988, as well as their only win in division play.
|-
| 
| style="| 
| style="| Oilers  23–16
| style="| Oilers  27–0
| Steelers  27–14
|
|- style="font-weight:bold; background:#f2f2f2;"
| 1989 playoffs
| style="| 
|
| style="| Steelers  26–23(OT)
| Steelers  28–14
| AFC Wild Card playoffs. Final game as Oilers coach for Jerry Glanville. Final postseason meeting as division rivals.
|-

|-
| 
| Tie 1–1
| style="| Steelers  20–9
| style="| Oilers  34–14
| Steelers  29–15
| Both games were Sunday night games.
|-
| 
| Tie 1–1
| style="| Steelers  26–14
| style="| Oilers  31–6
| Steelers  30–16
| 
|-
| 
| style="| 
| style="| Steelers  21–20
| style="| Steelers  29–24
| Steelers  32–16
|Bill Cowher's first game as Steelers head coach.
|-
| 
| style="| 
| style="| Oilers  26–17
| style="| Oilers  23–3
| Steelers  32–18
| Last regular season series sweep by the Oilers while located in Houston. Game in Houston was a Sunday night game.
|-
| 
| style="| 
| style="| Steelers  30–14
| style="| Steelers  12–9(OT)
| Steelers  34–18
| Game in Pittsburgh was a Monday night game.
|-
| 
| style="| 
| style="| Steelers  21–7
| style="| Steelers  34–17
| Steelers  36–18
| Steelers lose Super Bowl XXX.
|-
| 
| Tie 1–1
| style="| Steelers  30–16
| style="| Oilers  23–13
| Steelers  37–19
| Oilers' home game is the final game in rivalry to be held in Houston, and the final game between the two teams before the Oilers relocation to Tennessee in 1997.
|-
| 
| Tie 1–1
| style="| Steelers  37–24
| style="| Oilers  16–6
| Steelers  38–20
| Oilers' home game is the only matchup between the two teams in Liberty Bowl Memorial Stadium to date.
|-
| 
| style="| 
| style="| Oilers  41–31
| style="| Oilers  23–14
| Steelers  38–22
| Oilers' home game is the only meeting between the two to date at Vanderbilt Stadium. Last meeting between the two before Oilers change name to Titans in 1999.
|-
| 
| style="| 
| style="| Titans  47–36
| style="| Titans  16–10
| Steelers  38–24
| Meeting in Tennessee is first meeting at Nissan Stadium (previously named Adelphia Coliseum). Titans lose Super Bowl XXXIV.
|-

|-
| rowspan="2" | 
| style="| Titans  23–20
| Three Rivers Stadium
| rowspan="2" | Steelers  38–26
| Final meeting between the two teams at Three Rivers Stadium.  Steve McNair returned after injury two weeks earlier.
|-
| style="| Titans  9–7
| Adelphia Coliseum
| 
|-
| rowspan="2" | 
| style="| Steelers  34–7
| Heinz Field
| rowspan="2" | Steelers  40–26
| First meeting at Heinz Field. 
|-
| style="| Steelers  34–24
| Adelphia Coliseum
| Final meeting as division rivals. Titans moved to new AFC South for the 2002 season while Steelers remain in AFC Central, renamed AFC North.
|-
| 
| style="| Titans  31–23
| Adelphia Coliseum
| Steelers  40–27
| Tommy Maddox was knocked out with temporary paralysis and had to sit out several games in ensuing weeks; he returned late in the season.
|- style="font-weight:bold; background:#f2f2f2;"
| 2002 playoffs
| style="| Titans  
| Adelphia Coliseum
| Steelers  40–28
| AFC Divisional playoffs – Final postseason meeting to date. Only postseason meeting with the Titans located in Tennessee.
|-
| 
| style="| Titans  30–13
| Heinz Field
| Steelers  40–29
|
|-
| 
| style="| Steelers  34–7
| Heinz Field
| Steelers  41–29
| Steelers win Super Bowl XL.
|-
| 
| style="| Titans  31–14
| LP Field
| Steelers  41–30
| Titans' Keith Bulluck and LenDale White stomped on a Terrible Towel late in the game after clinching victory and home-field advantage in the AFC playoffs. This would mark the Steelers' last loss before winning Super Bowl XLIII, while the Titans went winless until Week 7 of the  season, with many Titans fans believing the losing streak began due to the so-called "Terrible Curse".
|-
| 
| style="| Steelers  
| Heinz Field
| Steelers  42–30
| NFL Kickoff game.
|-

|-
| 
| style="| Steelers  19–11
| LP Field
| Steelers  43–30
| Steelers lose Super Bowl XLV.
|-
| 
| style="| Steelers  38–17
| Heinz Field
| Steelers  44–30
| Ben Roethlisberger ties Steeler record with 5 touchdown passes.
|-
| 
| style="| Titans  26–23
| LP Field
| Steelers  44–31
| Thursday night game.  First win of the year for Matt Hasselbeck substituting for injured Jake Locker.
|-
| 
| style="| Titans  16–9
| Heinz Field
| Steelers  44–32
| The quickest points scored in NFL history occurred (Titans accidentally commit a safety with 14:59 on the clock in the first quarter).
|-
| 
| style="| Steelers  27–24
| LP Field
| Steelers  45–32
|-
| 
| style="| Steelers  40–17
| Heinz Field
| Steelers  46–32
| 
|-

|-
| 
| style="| Steelers  27–24
| Nissan Stadium
| Steelers  47–32
| Sixth game since the 1973 season with two teams entering with 5–0 or better records (all previous winners eventually reaching the Super Bowl). Steelers' best start since 1978. Game was rescheduled due to a COVID-19 outbreak within the Titans organization.
|-
| 
| style="| Steelers  19–13
| Heinz Field
| Steelers  48–32
| Final start in the series for Ben Roethlisberger.
|-
| 
|
| Acrisure Stadium
|
|
|-

|-
| Regular season
| style="| 
| Steelers 25–12
| Tie 19–19
|
|-
| Postseason
| style="| 
| Steelers 2–0
| Tie 1–1
| AFC Wild Card playoffs: 1989. AFC Divisional playoffs: 2002. AFC Championship Game: 1978–1979.
|-
| Regular and postseason 
| style="| 
| Steelers 27–12
| Tie 20–20
| 
|-

References

Pittsburgh Steelers
Houston Oilers
Tennessee Titans
National Football League rivalries
Pittsburgh Steelers rivalries
Tennessee Titans rivalries